Arthur Charles William Crook (16 February 1912 – 15 July 2005) was an English writer and former editor of the Times Literary Supplement.

Crook was educated at Holloway County Grammar School and did not attend university. He began his career in newspapers as a messenger boy on The Times. He crossed from The Times to become a clerck on the Supplement in 1930 and quickly became a contributor to the "Books to Come" section.

Personal life 
Crook enjoyed travelling, even in his later years. He was a member of the Garrick Club.

References 

1912 births
2005 deaths
British writers
British newspaper editors